The Midwestern Junior C Hockey League (MWJCHL) was a Canadian Junior ice hockey league in Southwestern Ontario.  The MWJCHL was a member of the Ontario Hockey Association and Hockey Canada.  Its champion competed for the Clarence Schmalz Cup, the OHA Junior C championship.

In the summer of 2016, the MWJCHL joined the Provincial Junior Hockey League.

History

The Midwestern Junior C Hockey League formed in the summer of 2013 due to the realignment of the severely overlapping Southern Ontario Junior Hockey League and Niagara & District Junior C Hockey League.  Originally the NDJCHL was going to proceed with 18 teams, but the decision was made to divide the league into two leagues based on divisional lines.  The MWJCHL was what was to be the Western Division of the NDJCHL in 2013-14.  Of the nine current members of the league, in 2012-13 the Ayr Centennials, Burford Bulldogs, Delhi Travellers, Tavistock Braves, and Wellesley Applejacks were all members of the Southern Ontario Junior Hockey League, while the New Hamburg Firebirds, Norwich Merchants, Paris Mounties, and Woodstock Navy-Vets came from the Niagara League.

On September 13, 2013, the Wellesley Applejacks traveled to New Hamburg, Ontario to face the New Hamburg Firebirds in the first game in MWJCHL history.  New Hamburg's Matt Yantzi scored 2:19 into the first period to tally the league's first ever goal.  The Applejacks would win the game 6-3, with their own Taylor Doering scoring the league's first ever game-winning-goal and Josh Heer making 32 saves for the first ever victory.

On March 13, 2014, regular season champion Paris Mounties defeated 2nd place Ayr Centennials to win the first MWJCHL championship.

The teams

2015-16 Playoffs
Winner moves on to the Clarence Schmalz Cup.

Champions

Regular Season Champions

References

External links
MWJCHL Website
OHA Website

C
C
Sports leagues established in 2013
2013 establishments in Ontario
Organizations based in Ontario
Sport in Cambridge, Ontario